Jeff Worthington is an American paralympic athlete. He participated at the 1988 Summer Paralympics.

Biography 
Worthington was from Colorado Springs, Colorado. He had met Paralympian athlete John Brewer in the 1980s and adopted Brewer’s pushing technique. Worthington participated in the athletics competition at the 1988 Summer Paralympics. He won the gold medal in the men's 400m 1C event, and also won gold in the men's 800m 1C event, with Brewer finishing second. He also won individual gold medals in the men's 1500m 1C event. and the men's 5000m 1C event, and team golds in the men's 4×100m relay 1A–1C and the men's 4×200m relay 1A–1C.

References

External links 

Living people
Place of birth missing (living people)
Year of birth missing (living people)
Athletes (track and field) at the 1988 Summer Paralympics
Medalists at the 1988 Summer Paralympics
Paralympic medalists in athletics (track and field)
Paralympic track and field athletes of the United States
Paralympic gold medalists for the United States